IoT Valley is a cluster created in 2011 and located in Labège in the south-east of Toulouse. This ecosystem is specialized in the Internet of things (IoT). Named TIC Valley at the beginning, the cluster adopted its current name in May 2015. The same year, the association launched its startup accelerator called the Connected Camp. In 2018, the association launched Genesis, an online training platform dedicated to innovations and the Internet of things.

References

External links
 Website of IoT Valley

High-technology business districts in France
 Internet of things
Toulouse
Midi-Pyrénées
Companies based in Occitania (administrative region)